The 2019 United States Grand Prix (officially known as the Formula 1 Emirates United States Grand Prix 2019) was a Formula One motor race held on November 3, 2019, at the Circuit of the Americas in Austin, Texas, United States. The race was the 19th round of the 2019 Formula One World Championship and marked the 49th running of the United States Grand Prix, the 41st time that the race was run as a World Championship event since the inaugural  season, and the 8th time that a World Championship round was held at the Circuit of the Americas in Austin, Texas.

Valtteri Bottas won the race from pole, Lewis Hamilton finished second with Max Verstappen third. In finishing second, Hamilton secured his sixth world championship.

Background

Championship standings before the race
Heading into the race, Mercedes had already secured their sixth consecutive Constructors title. But the Drivers Championship was still undecided with Lewis Hamilton leading the World Championship by 74 points over teammate Valtteri Bottas. Hamilton would win the title if Bottas failed to outscore him by 22 points. This meant that if Bottas failed to win or if Hamilton finished in the top eight (or top nine with the fastest lap) Hamilton would win his sixth title and his third consecutively.

Entrants

The drivers and teams were the same as the season entry list with no additional stand-in drivers for the race. However, Nicholas Latifi drove in the first practice session for Williams, replacing George Russell. This also marked the 100th race start for Red Bull Racing driver Max Verstappen.

Practice
At the end of the second practice session Sergio Pérez failed to stop when instructed at the weigh bridge and he was therefore required to start the race from the pit lane.

Qualifying

Qualifying classification

Notes
  – Sergio Pérez was required to start the race from the pit lane after failing to stop at the weigh bridge at the end of the second practice session.

Race 
On the opening lap Valtteri Bottas maintained his lead going into the first corner and Charles Leclerc lost 4th place to Lewis Hamilton at turn 1. Alexander Albon and Carlos Sainz Jr. collided entering the pits for repairs at the end of the first lap. The collision was later deemed a racing incident by the stewards and neither driver was reprimanded. Sebastian Vettel immediately encountered problems complaining of severe understeer despite avoiding contact with other drivers. By the start of the second lap Vettel had dropped to 7th place losing positions to Max Verstappen, Hamilton, Leclerc, Lando Norris and Daniel Ricciardo.

On lap 8, Vettel, still in 7th place, ran over a bumpy section of kerb on the exit of turn 9 causing his right-rear suspension to fail. He pulled over to the side of the track on the straight after turn 11 where his car was quickly removed by the marshals. Shortly afterwards Ricciardo passed Norris to claim 5th place. Verstappen was the first of the front-runners to make a scheduled pit stop at the end of lap 13 switching to hard-compound tyres. At this point in the race it was uncertain whether these tyres would last until the end or if Verstappen would require another stop. Bottas, who was still leading the race, came into the pits on the following lap for hard-compound tyres and maintained his position ahead of Verstappen upon exiting the pits.

The Ferrari of Leclerc, which was struggling for pace, was passed by both Bottas and Verstappen on lap 16 despite having yet to make a pit stop. Leclerc's problems were then exacerbated by a slow pit stop on lap 20. Hamilton, who was leading the race, was told by his team to pit on lap 23 to avoid holding up teammate, Bottas, who was close behind. Hamilton refused, claiming that his tyres were able to last longer and he was overtaken by Bottas for the lead before pitting at the end of the lap. This made the order of the top four Bottas, Verstappen, Hamilton and Leclerc after the first round of pit stops for the front-runners.

Robert Kubica was retired from the race on lap 32 after his Williams suffered an oil leak. The kerb on the exit of turn 9 continued to cause problems for other drivers after ending Vettel's race, with Sainz suffering bodywork damage on lap 34 after driving over it. Verstappen made a second stop on the same lap as his tyres began to wear out and the gap to Hamilton behind was narrowing. Mercedes responded to Verstappen on the following lap by bringing in Bottas, as they had done earlier in the race. Bottas maintained his position ahead of Verstappen but was now ten seconds behind race leader Hamilton. 

Hamilton began to question his team's strategy, claiming over the radio that he was unsure if his tyres could make it to the end of the race. On lap 37 Albon cleared the midfield after his lap 1 incident by passing Ricciardo for 5th place. However Albon would later have to make a third pit stop, after which he re-passed Sergio Pérez, Pierre Gasly, Sainz, Norris and finally Ricciardo again on lap 48 to reclaim 5th place. Bottas and Verstappen began to close in on Hamilton with Bottas catching up to within one second with six laps to go. Bottas finally took the lead of the race on lap 52 after Hamilton had fought off previous attempts. Shortly afterwards Gasly and Pérez made contact as Pérez took 9th place. This resulted in suspension damage for Gasly who came into the pits, rejoined the track, but, returned to the pits a lap later to retire the car from the race.

Verstappen was now within three seconds of Hamilton but was catching him quickly. However, Verstappen's charge was halted when on the penultimate lap Kevin Magnussen, who was in 16th place, suffered a brake failure at turn 12 and spun into the gravel. This incident brought out yellow flags preventing overtaking into turn 12. Daniil Kvyat collided with Pérez on the final lap whilst attempting an overtake for 10th place breaking Pérez' front wing. Kvyat was handed a 5-second penalty after the race demoting him outside of the points to 12th place.

Hamilton held off Verstappen to take 2nd place and with it his sixth World Drivers' Championship, making him the outright second most accomplished Formula One driver of all time ahead of Juan Manuel Fangio and behind Michael Schumacher. This also marked Hamilton's 150th podium finish.

Race classification 

Notes
  – Includes one point for fastest lap.
  – Daniil Kvyat originally finished 10th, but received a 5-second time penalty for causing a collision with Sergio Pérez.
  – Pierre Gasly and Kevin Magnussen were classified as they completed more than 90% of the race distance.

Championship standings after the race 

Drivers' Championship standings

Constructors' Championship standings

 Note: Only the top five positions are included for both sets of standings.
 Bold text indicates the 2019 World Champions.

References

External links

United States
United States Grand Prix
Grand Prix
United States Grand Prix
United States Grand Prix